Amsinckia menziesii is a species of plant in the family Boraginaceae, the borage or forget-me-not family.

Varieties
The plant has two varieties:

Amsinckia menziesii var. intermedia - common fiddleneck, intermediate fiddleneck
Amsinckia menziesii var. menziesii - Menzies' fiddleneck

Var. intermedia

Amsinckia menziesii var. intermedia (common fiddleneck, or intermediate fiddleneck) is one of the common fiddlenecks of western North America, distributed from Alaska and Canada through the Western United States to Mexico. Like other members of the genus, it has a terminal flowering whorl somewhat shaped like the head of a violin or fiddle, hence the name fiddleneck.  The flowers are yellow-orange, orange, or dark yellow.

In Australia, the species has become a common weed of cultivated areas in New South Wales, Victoria and Queensland. In the British Isles, it is an introduced species naturalised particularly in the east of the country and recorded in the wild since 1910.

Its seeds, while inedible to humans due to their high pyrrolizidine alkaloid content, are the favorite food of Lawrence's goldfinch during that Californian bird's nesting season of spring and early summer.

References

  Jepson Manual treatment - Amsinckia menziesii 
USDA: NRCS Plants Profile Amsinckia menziesii var. intermedia
Images at CalPhotos

External links 

CalFlora Database: Amsinckia menziesii (Menzies' fiddleneck,  Small flowered fiddleneck)
Jepson Manual eFlora (TJM2) treatment of Amsinckia menziesii
USDA Plants Profile for Amsinckia menziesii (Menzies' fiddleneck)

menziesii
Flora of Western Canada
Flora of the Northwestern United States
Flora of the Southwestern United States
Flora of California
Natural history of the California chaparral and woodlands
Natural history of the California Coast Ranges
Natural history of the Channel Islands of California
Natural history of the Colorado Desert
Natural history of the Mojave Desert
Natural history of the Peninsular Ranges
Natural history of the San Francisco Bay Area
Natural history of the Transverse Ranges
Flora without expected TNC conservation status